Bediako Asare (born 1930) is a Ghanaian journalist and author, initially from Ghana. He began his career working on local newspapers, then relocated to Dar es Salaam, Tanzania in 1963, to help launch The Nationalist newspaper.

In 1969 he published his novel Rebel, about the conflict between traditional ways and modernity in Sub-Saharan Africa. Writing in Africa Report, Sheila Wilson said of The Rebel: "The story is simple and the language unpretentious, and the impact of change and hope gives strength and quality to the novel." Asare's novel The Stubborn was published in Nairobi in 1976. Stephen H. Arnold, reviewing it in the African Book Publishing Record, noted that its intended audience was "15-18 year olds of East African ruling classes" and that: "The main themes are science versus superstition and the value of counsel from elders."

Works
Rebel, Heinemann Educational Books, African Writers Series no. 59, 1969
The Stubborn, Nairobi: East African Lit. Bureau, 1976.

References

Ghanaian writers
Living people
1930 births
Ghanaian emigrants to Tanzania
Ghanaian novelists